Martin Norberg (28 December 1902 – 18 September 1991) was a Swedish water polo player who competed in the 1924 Summer Olympics. In 1924 he was part of the Swedish team which finished fourth. He played all six matches.

References

1902 births
1991 deaths
Swedish male water polo players
Olympic water polo players of Sweden
Water polo players at the 1924 Summer Olympics